Anita Moen (born 31 August 1967), sometimes credited as Anita Moen-Guidon, is a Norwegian former cross-country skier who competed from 1987 to 2003. She won five medals at the Winter Olympics with three silvers (4 × 5 km relay: 1994, 1998, 2002) and two bronzes (15 km: 1998, Individual sprint: 2002).

Moen also won four 4 × 5 km relay medals at the FIS Nordic World Ski Championships with three silvers (1995, 2001, 2003) and one bronze (1993). Her best individual finish at the World Championships was fifth in the 30 km event in 1997.

Moen won eighteen races in her career at all levels from 1992 to 2002. In 2001, she won the Tjejvasan.

Moen now has a ski academy, where she teaches skiing.

Cross-country skiing results
All results are sourced from the International Ski Federation (FIS).

Olympic Games
 5 medals – (3 silver, 2 bronze)

World Championships
 4 medals – (3 silver, 1 bronze)

a.  Cancelled due to extremely cold weather.

World Cup

Season standings

Individual podiums
3 victories 
20 podiums

Team podiums

 5 victories – (3 ,  2 ) 
 29 podiums – (25 , 4 )

Note:   Until the 1999 World Championships and the 1994 Olympics, World Championship and Olympic races were included in the World Cup scoring system.

References

External links
 
 
 

1967 births
Living people
Norwegian female cross-country skiers
Olympic cross-country skiers of Norway
Olympic silver medalists for Norway
Olympic bronze medalists for Norway
Cross-country skiers at the 1994 Winter Olympics
Cross-country skiers at the 1998 Winter Olympics
Cross-country skiers at the 2002 Winter Olympics
Olympic medalists in cross-country skiing
FIS Nordic World Ski Championships medalists in cross-country skiing
Medalists at the 2002 Winter Olympics
Medalists at the 1998 Winter Olympics
Medalists at the 1994 Winter Olympics
People from Elverum
Sportspeople from Innlandet